Otites bivittata is a species of ulidiid or picture-winged fly in the genus Otites of the family Tephritidae.

References

bivittata